Herbert Walter Trafton (May 26, 1864 – August 20, 1936) was an American politician from Maine. Trafton, a Democrat from Fort Fairfield, Maine, served two terms in the Maine House of Representatives. He was first elected in 1910 and again in 1914. During the 1915–1916 session, Trafton was House Speaker. He later served 18 years as a member of the Maine Public Utilities Commission.

References

1864 births
1936 deaths
People from Fort Fairfield, Maine
Speakers of the Maine House of Representatives
Democratic Party members of the Maine House of Representatives